Ladies Only may refer to:
 Ladies Only, the Malayalam dubbed version of Magalir Mattum (1994), later remade as Ladies Only in Hindi
 Ladies Only (1939 film), an Indian Hindi-language social comedy film